De Toneelschuur is a theater in Haarlem, Netherlands.

The building has two theaters and two movie theaters. In the latter more alternative movies are shown (no Hollywood blockbusters). The name Filmschuur is often used to indicate the movie theaters.

From 1998 to 2003 the current building of the theater at the Lange Begijnestraat 9 was renovated as part of the Appelaar plan. The new design of the building was made by Joost Swarte, a Dutch cartoonist, in 1996. It was the first time in the Netherlands that a building was designed by a cartoonist. Joost Swarte was assisted by Mecanoo, an architecture bureau.

Before 2003 the theater was located at Smedestraat 23.

The manager of the Toneelschuur is Frans Lommerse.

External links
 Toneelschuur (website)

Buildings and structures in Haarlem
Theatres in the Netherlands
Cinemas and movie theaters in the Netherlands
Tourist attractions in Haarlem